The 2008 Canara Bank Bangalore Open was the biggest Women's WTA Tennis Tournament of South and South-East Asia in 2008. It took place from 3 March to 9 March in the KST Signature Kingfisher Tennis stadium in the Indian city of Bangalore on outdoor hardcourts. 2008 was the sixth edition of the event, and the third held in Bangalore. The tournament had been upgraded to Tier 2 from a Tier 3 event and would offer a total prize money pot of US$600,000 up from $175,000 last year.

The field was led by Jelena Janković and formers world #1, Venus Williams and Serena Williams. Patty Schnyder, Ágnes Szávay, Sybille Bammer and Vera Zvonareva were also present.

Sania Mirza, the top Indian woman tennis player decided to skip her home event, citing the number of controversies that ensue every time she plays at home. According to Mirza: "Every time I play in India, there has been a problem. So [me and my manager] just thought it was better not to play this time."

WTA entrants

Seeds

1 Rankings are as of 25 February 2008

Other entrants
The following players received wild cards into the main singles draw:
  Isha Lakhani
  Shikha Uberoi

The following player used protected ranking to gain entry into the singles main draw:
  Sanda Mamić

The following players received entry from the singles qualifying draw:
  Angelika Bachmann
  Monica Niculescu
  Sun Tiantian
  Ágnes Szatmári

Champions

Singles

 Serena Williams def.  Patty Schnyder, 7–5, 6–3
 It was Williams' first title of the year and 29th of her career.

Doubles

 Peng Shuai /  Sun Tiantian def.  Chan Yung-jan /  Chuang Chia-jung, 6–4, 5–7, 10–8

References

External links
Official website

2008 WTA Tour
2008
2008 in Indian tennis